Dance and Laugh Amongst the Rotten is the fifth studio album by Dutch symphonic black metal band Carach Angren. It was released on June 16, 2017 via Season of Mist. Although the album doesn't follow a linear story as their previous albums did, it is still a concept album. Clemens "Ardek" Wijers describes the album's concept as visitations from multiple ghosts of the dead; including the "Blood Queen" and Charles Francis Coghlan. The full album is focused on a nameless girl who plays with a Ouija board causing her to raise a variety of spirits and ends up getting possessed. The album ends by informing the listener that the box the CD came in is haunted by these same spirits, and that by opening the album, the listener has also released them.

Track listing
Composed by Ardek.
Guitars written by Ardek (tracks 5 to 9) and Seregor (tracks 2 to 9).
Lyrics by Ardek (tracks 3, 5, 7 & 9) and Seregor (tracks 2, 4, 6 & 8)
Violin written by Ardek (tracks 3 to 9)

Personnel
Credits adapted from the album's liner notes.

Carach Angren
Dennis "Seregor" Droomers – guitar, sound effects, vocals, backing vocals on "Opening"
Clemens "Ardek" Wijers – guitar, bass, keyboards, orchestral arrangements, orchestration, violin, backing vocals on "Opening"
Ivo "Namtar" Wijers – drums, sound effects

Additional musicians
 Patrick Damiani – guitar, bass, guitar engineer
 Nikos Mavridis – violin (tracks 3 to 9)

Team
Costin Chioreanu – artwork, design
Jonas Kjellgren – mastering
Peter Tägtgren – mixing, drum engineering
Sylvy Notermans – proof reading
Erik Wijnands – lyric consultant

Charts

References

2017 albums
Season of Mist albums
Carach Angren albums
Concept albums